The India Gazette; or, Calcutta Public Advertiser was an English language weekly newspaper published in Kolkata (then Calcutta), the capital of British India. It was the second newspaper printed in India. Founded by Bernard Messink and Peter Reed, two East India Company employees, the paper was a strong supporter of the administration of the Governor General Warren Hastings, and a rival to India's first newspaper Hicky's Bengal Gazette. It was founded on 18 November 1780

References

English-language newspapers published in India
Newspapers established in 1780
Newspapers published in Kolkata
Weekly newspapers published in India